Noxen Township is a township in Wyoming County, Pennsylvania, United States. The population was 919 at the 2020 census.

History

The Noxen School was listed on the National Register of Historic Places in 2006.

Geography

According to the United States Census Bureau, the township has a total area of 28.73 square miles (74.4 km2), of which 28.7 square miles (74 km2)  is land and 0.03 square mile (0.1 km2)  (0.1%) is water.

Demographics

As of the census of 2010, there were 902 people, 363 households, and 237 families residing in the township.  The population density was 31.4 people per square mile (12.1/km2).  There were 427 housing units at an average density of 14.9/sq mi (5.8/km2).  The racial makeup of the township was 98.8% White, 0.2% Native American, 0.1% from other races, and 0.9% from two or more races. Hispanic or Latino of any race were 0.3% of the population.

There were 363 households, out of which 33.6% had children under the age of 18 living with them, 47.9% were married couples living together, 11.8% had a female householder with no husband present, and 34.7% were non-families. 28.1% of all households were made up of individuals, and 11.8% had someone living alone who was 65 years of age or older.  The average household size was 2.48 and the average family size was 3.03.

In the township the population was spread out, with 24.8% under the age of 18, 58.9% from 18 to 64, and 16.3% who were 65 years of age or older.  The median age was 41.4 years.

The median income for a household in the township was $46,932, and the median income for a family was $50,455. Males had a median income of $39,375 versus $24,125 for females. The per capita income for the township was $20,386.  About 5.8% of families and 9.2% of the population were below the poverty line, including 19.9% of those under age 18 and none of those age 65 or over.

References

Townships in Wyoming County, Pennsylvania
Townships in Pennsylvania